Rodarius Lee Williams (born September 12, 1996) is an American football cornerback for the New York Giants of the National Football League (NFL). He played college football at Oklahoma State.

Early life and high school
Williams grew up in Shreveport, Louisiana and attended Calvary Baptist Academy.

College career
Williams was a member of the Oklahoma State Cowboys for five seasons, redshirting as a true freshman. He became a starter going into his redshirt freshman year. Williams was named second-team All-Big 12 Conference as a redshirt senior after allowing only nine pass completions and breaking up seven passes.

Professional career

In the 2021 NFL Draft, Williams was drafted in the sixth round (201st overall) by the New York Giants. On May 13, 2021, Williams officially signed with the Giants. He suffered a torn ACL in Week 5 and was ruled out for the season.

On August 31, 2022, Williams was placed on injured reserve. He was activated on November 14.

Personal life
Williams is the older brother of NFL defensive back Greedy Williams.

References

External links
Oklahoma State Cowboys bio

Living people
New York Giants players
Players of American football from Shreveport, Louisiana
American football cornerbacks
Oklahoma State Cowboys football players
1996 births